Holographic Studios, located in the borough of Manhattan in New York City, is the world's oldest gallery of holography. It was founded in 1979 by Jason Sapan, one of the pioneers of holography.  The storefront level gallery features the world's largest collection of motion image integral holograms. On display in the gallery are a variety of different types of holographic images, including a collection of celebrity hologram portraits. There are also cylindrical 360° floating images, multiple image holograms that change as you walk by, and computer generated holograms as well as a selection of novelty hologram items and stickers. Directly below the gallery is the laser laboratory where holograms are created. Holographic Studios creates custom holograms, holographic portraits, offers classes, and operates tours.

History 
The studio was founded in 1979 in a brownstone that was originally a blacksmith's forge.  The current building sits on land that was part of the Rose Hill estate of Revolutionary General Horatio Gates.

Over the decades, the studio has filmed portrait holograms of Andy Warhol, President Bill Clinton, Isaac Asimov, NYC Mayor Ed Koch, Prime Minister Edward Heath, Pierre Cardin, Sally Jessy Raphael, John Kenneth Galbraith, Phyllis Diller, Billy Idol, The Smothers Brothers, Phil Donahue, and John Cage. Their corporate clientele include commissions for Mitsubishi, AT&T, Tag Heuer, Goodyear, IBM, NYU Medical Center, Macy's, and Revlon.

Notable interns
John Gaeta, who won the Academy Award for visual effects in The Matrix
Vince Gilligan, who won multiple Emmys for his television show Breaking Bad
Jason Corsaro, who won Grammy awards as a recording engineer on albums including Like a Virgin by Madonna
Sonnie Brown, who starred in the Lincoln Center production of Far East

References

External links 
Holographic Studios
Gizmodo: The Art of the Hologram Is Alive in This Underground Laboratory
New York Originals: Holographic Studios
Tested Asks: How Are Holograms Made?
NY Times: Holographic Studios and Kalustyan’s Cafe in Kips Bay

Holography
1979 establishments in New York City
Culture of New York City
Art museums and galleries in Manhattan